"Land of Hope and Glory" is a 1902 British song by Edward Elgar.

Land of Hope and Glory may also refer to:

 Land of Hope and Glory (film), a 1927 British silent film
 "Land of Hope and Glory", a 1984 single by the Ex Pistols
 "Land of Hope and Glory", a song by the British band Madness from the 1979 album One Step Beyond...

See also
 "Land of Hope and Dreams", a 1999 song by Bruce Springsteen
 Land of Hope and Gloria, a 1992 British sitcom